Colonel William Gore-Langton (December 1760 – 14 March 1847), known as William Gore until 1783, was a British politician. He sat in the House of Commons for 45 years.

Background
Born William Gore, he was the son of Edward Gore and Barbara, daughter of Sir George Browne, 3rd Baronet. This branch of the Gore family descends from Sir John Gore, Lord Mayor of London in 1624, younger son of Gerard Gore, whose elder son Sir Paul Gore, 1st Baronet, of Magharabeg was the ancestor of the Earls of Arran, the Barons Annaly and the Barons Harlech. Montague Gore was his nephew.

Political career
Gore-Langton was Member of Parliament for Somerset between 1795 and 1806 and again between 1812 and 1826, for Tregony between 1808 and 1812 and for Somerset East between 1832 and 1847. He was also a Colonel in the Oxford Militia.

Family
Gore-Langton married firstly Bridget, daughter of Joseph Langton (d. 1779), in 1783, and assumed the same year by Royal licence the additional surname and arms of Langton according to the will of his father-in-law. Through this marriage Newton Park in Somerset came into the Gore family. After Bridget's death in 1793 he married secondly Mary, daughter of John Browne. There were children from both marriages. His son from his first marriage, William Gore-Langton, was the father of William Gore-Langton and the grandfather of William Temple-Gore-Langton, 4th Earl Temple of Stowe while his son from his second marriage, Henry Gore-Langton, represented Bristol in Parliament.

References

External links 
 

1760 births
1847 deaths
Members of the Parliament of Great Britain for English constituencies
British MPs 1790–1796
British MPs 1796–1800
Members of the Parliament of the United Kingdom for English constituencies
UK MPs 1801–1802
UK MPs 1802–1806
UK MPs 1807–1812
UK MPs 1812–1818
UK MPs 1818–1820
UK MPs 1820–1826
UK MPs 1831–1832
UK MPs 1832–1835
UK MPs 1835–1837
UK MPs 1837–1841
UK MPs 1841–1847
Members of the Parliament of the United Kingdom for constituencies in Cornwall
William